Thaddeus Presbitero Durano Jr. (born August 17, 1972), also known as his stage name DJ Durano, is a Filipino actor, television personality, singer and recording artist. His career in entertainment started as part of That's Entertainment of German Moreno. He has been the lead vocalist of bands like "Intense", "Musik Jive", "Frontline" and "Next Level".

Filmography

Television

Movies

References
 https://web.archive.org/web/20110724093108/http://telebisyon.net/Deejay-Durano/artista/
 https://web.archive.org/web/20110426031714/http://www.filipinomusica.com/dj-durano.html

External links
 

1974 births
Living people
21st-century Filipino male singers
That's Entertainment Wednesday Group Members
GMA Network personalities
ABS-CBN personalities
DJ
Filipino male comedians
Filipino male film actors
Filipino male television actors